O. A. K. Thevar (1924–1973) was an Indian actor. He acted in over 200 films and stage plays. He is known for his antagonistic roles. In 1955 he acted his debut movie Maman Magal. His notable movie are Mahadhevi, Thaikkupin Tharam, Uthama Puthiran, Veerapandiya Kattabomman, Karnan.

Early life 
O.A.K. Thevar's native place was Othapatti near Usilampatti in Madurai. His birth name was Karuppu Thevar. In his early school days during the lunch break, he excelled in singing and singing long verses. He was interested in acting and singing more than learn education, but his father didn't like his son's interests. After completing school, Thevar's father enrolled his son in the army. Thevar sang there, cheering on fellow soldiers, OAK. He was famous throughout the South Battalion where he worked. After completing four years of military service, the father of the deceased, who had arrived in the village, never returned to his camp. Thevar went to the drama of Shakti Drama Sabha's camp in Trichy. In the Shakti Drama Sabha, the later screen stars were Sivaji Ganesan, M.N. Nambiar, S.V. Subbaiah and many others. Poet Pattukottai Kalyanasundaram, who played the royal roles in a poet's dream drama Became a close friend of thevar. after he met N.S. Krishnan, who was known for his ability to applaud the talented and give away everything at hand, was the famous editor RS. Mani Maman Magal (1955) was produced and directed by Mani. Gave to thevar. Though he played the role of a hero named Veerasamy, the film was brightly identified with Thevar.

Personal life
His son O. A. K. Sundar is also an actor who mostly portrays antagonistic roles.

Filmography 
This list is incomplete; you can help by expanding it.

1950s

1960s

1970s

References

External links 

Male actors from Tamil Nadu
20th-century Indian actors
Male actors in Tamil cinema
1924 births
1973 deaths